The Gauja River is a river in the Vidzeme region of Latvia. It is the only large river of Latvia that begins and ends its flow in Latvia. Its length is 460 km, of which 93.5 km (approximately one-fifth) are in the Gauja National Park. In this part, the Gauja River flows through the Gauja valley, which is 1 to 2.5 km wide, and the maximum depth near Sigulda is 85 m. Thus, Gauja is the longest river of Latvia when we count only the parts of the river in the country's territory. Daugava has only 367 km in Latvia, while the whole river is over 1000 km.

The sandstone rocks on the banks of the Gauja and its adjoining rivers started forming 370 to 300 million years ago during the Devonian period.

History
Before the 13th century, the Gauja River used to serve as a trade route and border river between the Livonian and Latgalian lands. In some territories, they used to live mixed together. When Livonian languages were still present along the Gauja River and the sea, it used to be called Koivo (the Birch River; Livonian keùv or Estonian kõiv). In Latvian, the name of the Gauja River used to mean 'a great amount',  'a crowd', and was therefore called the 'big river'. The Livonians suffered greatly during the Great Northern War and suffered a plague in the 18th century. That was the period when the remaining Livonians assimilated with the Latvians.

Today

The Gauja River tends to change its bed rapidly, and has gained the reputation of being deceitful. The bed of the river is made of unconsolidated sand and gravel deposits that move along with the current. In some places, the bed is pebbly, forming boulder rapids: Kazu, Raiskuma, Rakšu, and Ķūķu. The bottom of the river in Gauja National Park is 60 to 120 meters wide with a rapidly changing depth from 0.3 m to 7 m. The decline is 0.5 m/km. The speed of flow during low water is 0.2 to 0.4 m/s, and during the spring water period  2 to 3 m/s. Due to the fluctuations in water level, current speed, and special flow features, the Gauja River may be characterized as a rather non-homogeneous watercourse.

Usually the Gauja River freezes over in the mid-December, and the ice starts moving in late March. During warm winters, the river does not freeze over. Much underground water flows into the Gauja River. It therefore has a lower water temperature than other large rivers in Latvia.

See also
Gauja Estonians
Gauja Formation
Gauja Valley

References

 
Rivers of Estonia
Rivers of Latvia
International rivers of Europe
Gulf of Riga
Drainage basins of the Baltic Sea
Estonia–Latvia border
Border rivers